Sanzhar Mussayev (born 11 April 1996) is a Kazakhstani archer. He competed in the men's individual event at the 2020 Summer Olympics.

References

External links
 

1996 births
Living people
Kazakhstani male archers
Olympic archers of Kazakhstan
Archers at the 2020 Summer Olympics
Place of birth missing (living people)
Archers at the 2014 Asian Games
Archers at the 2018 Asian Games
21st-century Kazakhstani people